William Edgar Hull (January 13, 1866 – May 30, 1942) was an American businessman and politician. He served as U.S. Representative from Illinois for five terms.

Born in Lewistown, Illinois, Hull attended the common schools, Lewistown High School, and Illinois College at Jacksonville, Illinois. Before running for office, Hull was president of the Manito Chemical Co. and served as Postmaster of Peoria, Illinois from 1898 to 1906. He served as a member of the board of directors of the Illinois Highway Improvement Association.

Hull was a delegate to the Republican National Conventions in 1916 and 1920. Hull was elected as a Republican to the Sixty-eighth and to the four succeeding Congresses (March 4, 1923 – March 3, 1933). He was an unsuccessful candidate for renomination in 1932.

After politics, Hull resumed his former pursuits in Peoria, Illinois. He died in a hospital in Toronto, Ontario, Canada, May 30, 1942, while on a visit. Hull is interred in Oak Hill Cemetery, Lewistown, Illinois.

References

William Edgar Hull at The Political Graveyard

1866 births
1942 deaths
Republican Party members of the United States House of Representatives from Illinois
People from Lewistown, Illinois